This all-time table compares national teams that have participated in the Rugby World Cup by a number of criteria including matches, wins, losses, draws, total points for, total points against, etc.

The table also shows – among other things – the accumulated points for every team that has ever participated in the tournament. This takes each game as if it were a World Cup pool stage match, with each team awarded four points for a win, two points for a draw and none for a defeat. A team scoring four tries in one match scored a bonus point, as did a team that lost by fewer than eight points.


All-time table
This is an incomplete list of total matches played by all countries that were invited or have qualified for the Rugby World Cup since the 1987 edition.

Last updated: 26 February 2023 
(to be recalculated: |PF
|PA
|PD
|%
|TB
|LB
|Pts
|Avg pts |)

Legend:

See also

Records and statistics of the Rugby World Cup
National team appearances in the Rugby World Cup

References

External links
World Rugby Stats Hub-RWC ALL TIME MOST MATCHES PLAYED
World Rugby Stats Hub-RWC ALL TIME MOST POINTS SCORED 
World Rugby Stats Hub-RWC ALL TIME MOST TRIES SCORED
IRB Rugby World Cup Team Records on Espnscrum.com

Rugby World Cup
Rugby union records and statistics